Mathias Ntawulikura (born 14 June 1964 in Gisovu/Kibuye) is a retired Rwandan long-distance runner. He reached the World Athletics Championships final and participated in the Olympic Games in the 5000 metres (1988) and 10,000 metres (1992, 1996) and marathon (2000, 2004). He also participated five times in the IAAF World Cross Country Championships.

His best Olympic performance was 8th in the 10,000 m at the 1996 Atlanta Olympics, a race where the top eight positions were taken by (six) African countries. He was forty when he competed in the marathon at the 2004 Athens Olympics; of the hundred men who started the race, he came 62nd with a time of 2hours, 26 minutes, 5 seconds.

He is the first (and as of 2010, only) Rwandan to compete at five Olympic Games. The only African to compete in five Olympics before him was Egyptian shooter Mohamed Khorshed. In 2004, Ntawulikura joined three other track and field athletes - Nigerian Mary Onyali, Mozambican Maria Mutola, and Angolan João N'Tyamba in becoming the second African to compete at five Olympics.

He was affiliated with the Pro Patria Milano sporting club in Italy.

International competitions

Personal bests
3000 metres - 7:43.09 min (1995) 
5000 metres - 13:11.29 min (1992) 
10,000 metres - 27:25.48 min (1996) 
Half marathon - 1:01:41 hrs (2000)
Marathon - 2:09:55 hrs (2000)

See also
List of athletes with the most appearances at Olympic Games

References

External links

1964 births
Living people
People from Karongi District
Rwandan male long-distance runners
Rwandan male cross country runners
Olympic male long-distance runners
Olympic athletes of Rwanda
Athletes (track and field) at the 1988 Summer Olympics
Athletes (track and field) at the 1992 Summer Olympics
Athletes (track and field) at the 1996 Summer Olympics
Athletes (track and field) at the 2000 Summer Olympics
Athletes (track and field) at the 2004 Summer Olympics
World Athletics Championships athletes for Rwanda
Japan Championships in Athletics winners